The 2018–19 Georgian Superliga was the 19th season of the Georgian Superliga since its establishment.

Dinamo Tbilisi were the defending champions.

Format
Regular season consisted in a double-legged round-robin competition where the eight best teams qualified for the playoffs.

Teams
The league was expanded to ten teams. Two clubs have been promoted from A-league, TSU Tbilisi as champion and MIA Academy Titebi as runner-up, and after winning a promotion/relegation playoff against Sokhumi.

Regular season

League table

Results

Playoffs
All the rounds will be played in a best-of-five games format, (2-2-1) format.

Bracket

Quarter-finals

|}

Semi-finals

|}

Third place match

|}

Finals

|}

Relegation playoffs
The winner of the playoffs between the ninth qualified and the runner-up of the A-League will join the next Superleague season with Vera, champion of the second-tiered league.

|}

Georgian clubs in European competitions

References

External links
Official Georgian Basketball Federation website

Georgian Superliga seasons
Georgia
Superliga